Nestor Hammarlund  (28 August 1888 – 30 January 1966) was a Swedish politician. He was born in Barkåkra, Scania, and was a member of the Centre Party.

References
This article was initially translated from the Swedish Wikipedia article.

Centre Party (Sweden) politicians
1888 births
1966 deaths
Place of death missing